This is a list of transactions that have taken place during the 2020 P. League+ off-season and the 2020–21 P. League+ season.

Retirement

Front office movements

Head coaching changes
Off-season

In-season

General manager changes
Off-season

Player movements

Free agents

Waived

Notes

References

2020-21
Transactions